Player Select is the second studio album by American comedy supergroup Starbomb, composed of Dan Avidan and Brian Wecht of American comedy duo Ninja Sex Party and Flash animator and Internet personality Arin Hanson. The album was released December 16, 2014 on iTunes, Amazon Music, Spotify and CDBaby. Following in the direction of the previous album, Player Select is mostly a video game parody album featuring the often-provocative adult comedy of Ninja Sex Party and incorporating the video-game humor of Hanson.

Background
Starbomb was a very hinted-at project with leaks and rumors circulating in June and July 2013 shortly after Avidan joined the online Let's Play webseries Game Grumps. It was half-confirmed by Avidan during his guest appearance on the July 12, 2013, stream of Polaris video gaming show Friendzone!, stating that he was thinking of names for a new music project he was starting with Brian Wecht, his partner in Ninja Sex Party.

Due to the majority of the first Starbomb album's criticism being aimed at its constant use of extremely sexual lyrics, Player Select takes a different approach by severely reducing the amount of sexuality in its lyrics. This was a conscious, self-imposed challenge that Hanson, Avidan, and Wecht agreed upon while writing the album in an effort to stay fresh and avoid repeating themselves. The resulting album focuses more on satirizing plot or character details regarding certain games, such as how Luigi consistently questions the violent nature of the Super Smash Bros. franchise throughout the song "Smash!"

Promotion
Player Select was also a half-confirmed album in a statement from the track "Outro" from the previous album. No other news was heard of the album until fan speculation of a second album started circulating in October and November 2014. The album and its release date, cover art and title were finally confirmed by all three members of Starbomb via three consequent videos featuring the group in their Los Angeles studio, each containing a separate snippet from one track of the album. The video that Hanson posted contained a snippet from "The Hero of Rhyme," Avidan and Wecht's video had a snippet from "Mortal Kombat High," and the video on the Game Grumps channel had a snippet of "Robots in Need of Disguise." Included in each video were links to pre-order the album digitally through iTunes and Amazon Music, or the physical CD through CDBaby.

Track listing

Personnel

Starbomb
 Danny Sexbang (Dan Avidan) – vocals
 Egoraptor (Arin Hanson) – vocals, production
 Ninja Brian (Brian Wecht) – music, production
 	
Additional musicians
Mark Fischbach – vocals (track 2)
Emily Hughes – background vocals (track 2)
Markus Persson – background vocals (track 12)

Additional personnel
Dan Castellani – mixing
David Dominguez – engineer
Hans Dekline – mastering

Charts

Weekly charts

Year-end charts

Release history

References

2014 albums
Starbomb albums